Diamonds, Diamonds is a "Greatest Hits" album by the Canadian rock band Max Webster. It was released in 1981 after the band had broken up, and features two new tracks: "Hot Spots" and "Overnight Sensation", which were recorded in 1975 during the debut album sessions. No songs from the band's fifth album, Universal Juveniles, are included on this album. An alternate version of "On the Road" from the High Class in Borrowed Shoes sessions was slated for release but pulled at the eleventh hour.

Track listing
All songs by Kim Mitchell and Pye Dubois, except where indicated
Side one
 "Gravity" – 4:52
 "High Class in Borrowed Shoes" – 3:59 
 "Diamonds, Diamonds" – 3:19 
 "Summer's Up" – 2:36 
 "Blowing the Blues Away" (Terry Watkinson) – 3:15 
 "Let Go the Line" (Watkinson) – 3:34 
 "A Million Vacations" (Gary McCracken, Dubois) – 3:14 

Side two
 "The Party" – 4:46 
 "Hot Spots" – 2:41 
 "Paradise Skies" – 3:27 
 "Overnight Sensation" – 2:55 
 "Lip Service" – 4:02 
 "Hangover" – 4:38 

Tracks 1-5, 13 produced by Max Webster and Terry Brown
Tracks 8, 9, 11, 12 produced by Max Webster, Terry Brown, Mike Tilka
Tracks 6, 7, 10 produced by Max Webster and John De Nottbeck

Personnel
Kim Mitchell – guitar and vocals
Paul Kersey – drums and percussion 
Gary McCracken – drums 
Mike Tilka – bass guitar and vocals 
Dave Myles – bass guitar 
Terry Watkinson – keyboards and vocals
Pye Dubois – lyrics

References

Max Webster albums
1982 greatest hits albums
Anthem Records compilation albums